In the United States each year, roughly 1 in 1,900 people are born with a limb difference, and an additional 185,000 individuals experience a limb amputation. Children's literature with representation of characters with upper limb differences help empower children to accept their own, as well as others', differences.

Books for children featuring characters with limb differences 
Books are listed by publication date. Bold text indicates author or illustrator with a limb difference.

See also
Congenital limb deformities
Amputation
List of children's books featuring deaf characters

References

Limb differences